Staroturayevo (İśke Turay) is a rural locality (a village) in Novokilbakhtinsky Selsoviet, Kaltasinsky District, Bashkortostan, Russia. The population was 202 as of 2010. There are 3 streets.

Geography 
Staroturayevo is located 31 km east of Kaltasy (the district's administrative centre) by road. Kachkinturay is the nearest rural locality.

References 

Rural localities in Kaltasinsky District